Holzbach is a river of Hesse, Germany. It is a left tributary of the Elbbach in Hadamar.

See also
List of rivers of Hesse

Rivers of Hesse
Rivers of the Westerwald
Rivers of Germany